Peres Spíndula de Oliveira (born 7 November 1974), also known as  Peres , is a Brazilian professional football player who last played for Home United FC in S.League. He retired at the end of the 2010 season.

Club career
Peres was born in Contagem, Brazil, and played for many teams in Brazil, including Esporte Clube Democrata and Sociedade Desportiva Serra Futebol Clube, before playing in Singapore.

He was the top scorer in Singapore's S.League in 2003, while playing for Home United FC. He was also named the S.League's Player of the Year for that year.

Oliveira moved to rivals Tampines Rovers FC together with Sutee Suksomkit at the end of the 2005 season. But then in 2008, he moved back to Home United.

Honours

Club

Home United
S.League: 2003
Singapore Cup: 2001,2003,2005

Tampines Rovers
Singapore Cup: 2006

Individual
S.League Player of the Year: 2003
S.League Top Scorer Award: 2003

References

Videos
youtube.com
youtube.com

External links

data2.7m.cn

1974 births
Living people
Brazilian footballers
Esporte Clube Democrata players
Tampines Rovers FC players
Singapore Premier League players
Home United FC players
Expatriate footballers in Singapore
Association football forwards
Association football midfielders